The Philadelphia trolleybus system forms part of the public transportation network serving Philadelphia, in the state of Pennsylvania, United States.  It opened on October 14, 1923, and is now the second-longest-lived trolleybus system in the world.  One of only five such systems currently operating in the U.S., it presently comprises three lines, and is operated by the Southeastern Pennsylvania Transportation Authority (SEPTA), with a fleet of 38 trolleybuses, or trackless trolleys as SEPTA calls them. The three surviving routes serve North and Northeast Philadelphia and connect with SEPTA's Market–Frankford rapid transit line.

History
The first trackless trolley (trolley bus) service in Philadelphia was operated by the Philadelphia Rapid Transit Company, which had been established in 1902 by the merger of several then-independent transit companies operating within the city and its environs. Through a reorganization, the company became the Philadelphia Transportation Company (PTC) on January 1, 1940. The PTC was transferred from private to public ownership on September 30, 1968, when SEPTA (formed in 1964) took it over.

Of more than 300 trolley bus systems in operation worldwide (as of 2011), Philadelphia's is the second-oldest, exceeded in longevity only by that of Shanghai, China (in operation since 1914). That also makes it the oldest system in the Western Hemisphere.

The three Northeast Philadelphia trolley bus lines operating out of Frankford Depot, and the two South Philadelphia lines which operated out of Southern Depot, always existed in isolation from each other; there was never any trackless route or non-revenue 2-wire connection between those two networks. In addition, from 1941 to 1961, there were actually three disconnected trackless networks in the city, as PTC Route 61 operated out of Ridge Depot (closed on December 4, 1960) and did not connect with any other trackless line. (Pre-MBTA Boston, and the former Toronto system, also featured two or more disconnected trolleybus networks.)

20th century 
Service began on October 14, 1923, with a fleet of 10 vehicles: nine  built by the J. G. Brill Company (a major U.S. streetcar manufacturer) and called the "Rail-less Car" model, and one experimental unit built by the Commercial Truck Company (the only trolley bus ever built by that company). A tenth Brill unit was acquired the following year. All were replaced by more modern Brill T30 trolley buses in 1935.

After the opening of route 80, 18 years would pass before a second trolley bus line was opened.  Route 61-Ridge Avenue became a trolley bus line on October 5, 1941, converted from streetcar operation. It was a much longer (11 miles) and more heavily used route. It ran from the Manayunk neighborhood, in the northwest, to the city center (locally known as Center City), and ultimately it was the only trolley bus route ever to serve Philadelphia's city center. PTC purchased 50 new, larger Brill trolley buses for this conversion, bought another 10 in 1942 and six vehicles from Pullman-Standard in 1944.

A total of five additional routes were opened later: 29-Tasker-Morris in 1947, 75-Wyoming Avenue in 1948, 59-Castor Avenue in 1950, 66-Frankford Avenue in 1955, and lastly 79-Snyder Avenue in June 1961. However, routes 80 and 61 were converted to diesel buses in May 1960 and March 1961, respectively, so the system never had more than six routes in operation concurrently. The conversion of route 79 may have been prompted by a desire or need by PTC to make use of some of the trolley coaches made surplus by the conversion or routes 61 and 80 to diesel buses.

The five trackless routes in place in mid-1961 continued to be served by trolley buses for the next four decades, and three remain so in 2011. The rush hour service on route 66 includes several express trips, and two sections of Frankford Avenue are equipped with a second set of trolleybus wires (in each direction) to enable trolley buses on express runs to pass those on local service. Route 66 also has "Night Owl" (all-night) service.

21st century
Until June 2002, five SEPTA routes used trolley buses, using AM General vehicles built in 1978–79. Routes 29, 59, 66, 75, and 79 used trolley buses, but were converted to diesel buses for an indefinite period starting in 2002 (routes 59, 66, 75) and 2003 (routes 29, 79). In the case of routes 59, 66 and 75, which are based at SEPTA's Frankford depot (garage), the initial reason for the conversion to buses was major reconstruction of the garage and the adjacent Market-Frankford "El" viaduct, and construction of a new Frankford Terminal. That work necessitated the temporary removal of the overhead trolley wires used by trolley buses both at the garage and along the deadhead route (running along Frankford Avenue, directly beneath the El viaduct) connecting routes 59 and 75 to the garage. Other reasons prompted the suspension of trolley bus service on routes 29 and 79, in 2003.

The 110 AM General vehicles that had provided service on SEPTA's then-five trolley bus routes never returned to service. However, the authority in early 2006 ordered 38 new New Flyer low-floor trolley buses, enough for routes 59, 66 and 75. In October 2006, the SEPTA board voted not to order additional vehicles for routes 29 and 79, and those routes became permanently operated with diesel buses. However, electric propulsion on these routes is expected to be resurrected upon the delivery of 25 new battery electric buses in 2017 using a Federal Transit Administration grant.

The pilot new low-floor trolley bus arrived in June 2007, for testing, but not in passenger service. The production-series vehicles were delivered in 2008 and began to enter service in April, enabling a resumption of trolley bus service in Philadelphia after a suspension of nearly 5 years. Trolley bus service resumed on routes 66 and 75 on April 14, 2008, and on route 59 the following day, but it was initially limited to just one or two vehicles on each route, as new trolley buses gradually replaced the motor buses serving the routes over a period of several weeks.

Routes

Current
Trolley buses currently still operate on only the following three SEPTA routes:

Former

Fleet

Past fleet, through the 1970s
Philadelphia's first trackless trolleys were supplied by the J. G. Brill Company in 1923. Brill was based in Philadelphia, but was one of the largest manufacturers of trolley cars (streetcars, or trams) in the world from the 1890s to the 1920s (last making streetcars in 1941), and produced trolley buses from 1921 to 1954.  Philadelphia purchased more trolley buses from Brill than from any other manufacturer, a total of 133. However, vehicles were also purchased from other builders, most notably Marmon-Herrington (71 units) and AM General (110).

The original fleet of ten  Brill "Rail-less Cars" of 1923–24 was replaced in 1935 by eight Brill T30 vehicles, another short vehicle.  With the conversion of the major Ridge Avenue route (61) to trolley buses in 1941, Philadelphia Transportation Company (PTC) again turned to Brill for the needed additional vehicles. PTC purchased 60 Brill trolley coaches (as such vehicles were then commonly called in the U.S.) in 1941–42, this time of the larger model 40SMT that the manufacturer had introduced in 1938.  In 1944, six new trolley coaches were purchased from Pullman-Standard, but that small batch was not followed by any other purchases from Pullman. In 1947, PTC purchased another 65 Brill vehicles, these being ACF-Brill model TC44, Brill having merged in 1944 with American Car and Foundry Company.  Some of these 1947 TC44 trolley buses remained in service on the Philadelphia system as late as 1981.

The next purchases were from the Marmon-Herrington Company.  PTC brought 28 of that builder's model TC46 in 1949 and then 43 of the larger model TC49 in 1955. These were the last trolley buses acquired for more than two decades.  Most of the older, pre-war trolley buses were scrapped in the 1960s.  SEPTA took over the transit system in 1968, and by the 1970s the normal operating practice was for the Brill TC44 trolley buses to be used on the two South Philadelphia routes, 29 and 79, and Marmon-Herrington vehicles to be used on the three Northeast Philadelphia routes, 59, 66 and 75.

Post-1970s

In the late 1970s, SEPTA partnered with Seattle's trolley bus system to place a joint order with AM General for new trolley buses, 110 for Philadelphia and 109 for Seattle.  Numbered 800–909 in SEPTA's fleet, these  vehicles were model 10240T, but had the same body style as Flyer Industries' model E800, used on several other U.S. and Canadian trolley bus systems from the 1980s to the 2000s, because the two manufacturers had worked together on the body design.  These 219 vehicles were the only trolley buses AM General ever built.  The first one built, SEPTA's No. 800, was tested on the Dayton trolley bus system in fall 1978.  The remainder of SEPTA's 110 units were built in 1979, and they arrived and entered service in 1980.  They were the system's first air-conditioned trolley buses. The last active Brill and Marmon-Herrington trolley buses were retired in 1981.

Because of service reductions in the 1980s and 1990s, the number of trolley buses needed for scheduled peak-period service on the five routes had declined to only 51 (plus spares) by at least the mid-1990s. Forty-four of the 110 AM Generals were placed in storage and later used for parts; in 2002, these were sold for scrap. The remaining 66 were placed in storage when all five routes were converted temporarily to diesel buses in 2002 and 2003. That conversion was later made permanent for routes 29 and 79. The stored AM General trolley buses, which were already 24 years old by 2003, did not return to service and were scrapped in mid-2006, but earlier the same year, SEPTA placed an order with New Flyer Industries for 38 new low-floor trolley buses.  Philadelphia's AM General trolley buses operated in service for the last time on June 30, 2003, the last day of trolley bus service on route 79. They were the last AMG-built trackless trolleys in service anywhere, because the only other transit system to use such vehicles, Seattle, retired its last AM Generals in March 2003. For the 38 new vehicles from New Flyer, SEPTA reused the same fleet-number series as had been used for the AM Generals; the Flyers are numbered 800–837.

Current fleet

The present Philadelphia trackless trolley fleet consists of 38 conventional-configuration (two-axle) trolley buses:

SEPTA placed its order for these trolley buses in February 2006. The first vehicle was delivered in June 2007, and the remaining 37 were received by SEPTA during 2008.  These trolley buses have a diesel-driven auxiliary power unit, which provides electric power to the motors to enable limited operation away from overhead trolley wires.

Preserved vehicles
A few retired Philadelphia trolley buses have been saved for historical preservation, including at public museums.  1947-built ACF-Brills 205 and 210 were acquired by the Shore Line Trolley Museum in 1981, when withdrawn from service in Philadelphia. Number 205 is in operating condition, and in 2009 it became the first trolley bus ever to operate at the museum (powered normally, from overhead wires), when it tested the first section of a short trolley bus line that is under construction there. The Seashore Trolley Museum's collection includes ex-Philadelphia trolley bus 336, a 1955 Marmon-Herrington TC49; it is not currently in operating condition. A few other ex-Philadelphia ACF-Brill and Marmon-Herrington trolley buses have been saved by private individuals, including one Marmon TC46. No other types of Philadelphia trolley buses, such as AM Generals or earlier types of Brill vehicles, have been preserved.

See also

List of trolleybus systems in the United States
SEPTA City Transit Division surface routes

References

Sources

External links

 
 
 Philadelphia Trackless Photos at Trolleybuses.net – Pictures, advertisements, literature about Philadelphia tracklesses

 
Philadelphia
Trolleybus transport in the United States
1923 establishments in Pennsylvania